Pierre Even is a Canadian film producer from Quebec. He is a two-time winner of the award for Best Motion Picture from the Academy of Canadian Cinema and Television, as producer of the films War Witch and C.R.A.Z.Y.; he was also nominated, but did not win, for Café de Flore.

His other production credits include The Colony, 5150 Elm's Way, Nitro, A Life Begins, Mars and April and Bon Cop, Bad Cop 2.

Filmography 
2005: C.R.A.Z.Y.
2007: Nitro
2008: Hank and Mike
2008: Le Banquet
2008: Modern Love
2008: The Woman of Ahhs
2009: Wild Hunt
2009: 5150 Elm's Way
2010: A Life Begins (Une vie qui commence)
2011: Café de Flore
2012: War Witch (Rebelle)
2012: Mars and April (Mars et Avril)
2013: Cyanide (Cyanure)
2013: The Colony
2014: Meetings with a Young Poet
2014: Miraculum
2014: The Masters of Suspense (Les Maîtres du suspense)
2015: Brooklyn
2016: Boundaries
2016: A Kid (Le fils de Jean)
2017: Eye on Juliet
2017: Bon Cop, Bad Cop 2
2017: We Are the Others (Nous sommes les autres)
2018: Birthmarked
2018: The Hummingbird Project
2021: Best Sellers
2021: Maria Chapdelaine

References

External links

Film producers from Quebec
French Quebecers
Living people
Canadian Film Centre alumni
Year of birth missing (living people)